Balzarini is an Italian surname. Notable people with the surname include:

Antonio Balzarini (born c. 1933), Italian racehorse owner and trainer
Guido Balzarini (1874–1935), Italian fencer
Luigi Balzarini (1935–2014), Italian footballer

Italian-language surnames